
Year 812 (DCCCXII) was a leap year starting on Thursday (link will display the full calendar) of the Julian calendar.

Events 
 By place 

 Byzantine Empire 
 January 11 – Ex-emperor Staurakios, a son of Nikephoros I, dies of putrefaction in his wounds (see 811) in a monastery. He has reigned only two months and eight days, before being exiled by senior officials in Constantinople.
 Emperor Michael I re-opens peace negotiations with the Franks, and recognizes Charlemagne as emperor (basileus) of the Frankish Empire. In exchange for this recognition, Venice is returned to the Byzantine Empire.
 Byzantine–Bulgarian War: The Bulgars, led by Krum, ruler (khan) of the Bulgarian Empire, launch an invasion against the Byzantines. They capture the fortress cities of Develt and Mesembria, near the Black Sea.

 Europe 
 Charlemagne conquers Catalonia, as far south as the River Ebro and the Balearic Islands. The counties come under the rule of Bera, count of Barcelona. He signs a three-year peace treaty with the Emirate of Córdoba.
 Charlemagne issues the Capitulare de villis, concerning the rights of a feudal landholder and the services owed by his dependents. It also contains the names of some 89 plants, of which most are used medically.
 The Republic of Amalfi sends galleys to support the Byzantine general (strategos) of Sicily, Gregorio, against the Aghlabid invaders. It is one of the earliest evidences of the independence of the city.
 At the death of king Hemming of Denmark two claimants to the throne, Sigfred and Anulo, meet in battle but are both killed. Harald and Reginfrid, brothers of Anulo, becomes joint kings of Denmark.

 Britain 
 King Sigered of Essex is reduced to the rank of duke, by his Mercian overlords.

 Abbasid Caliphate 
 Fourth Fitna: Forces loyal to al-Ma'mun, led by Tahir ibn Husayn, blockade Baghdad, which is loyal to al-Ma'mun's brother, Caliph al-Amin, and begin the year-long Siege of Baghdad.

 China 
 The Chinese government takes over the issuing of paper bank drafts, the ancestor of paper money.

Births 
 Domnall mac Ailpín, king of Scotland (d. 862)
 Li Rong, prince of the Tang Dynasty (or 813)
 Sugawara no Koreyoshi, Japanese nobleman (d. 880)
 Wang Yuankui, general of the Tang Dynasty (d. 854)
 Wen Tingyun, Chinese poet and lyricist (d. 870)

Deaths 
 January 11 – Staurakios, Byzantine emperor
 Abd al-Malik ibn Salih, Abbasid general (b. 750)
 Candidus of Fulda, Benedictine scholar 
 Du You, chancellor of the Tang Dynasty (b. 735)
 Flann mac Congalaig, king of Brega (Ireland)
 Fujiwara no Uchimaro, Japanese nobleman (b. 756)
 Hemming, king of Denmark
 Ibrahim I, Muslim emir of the Aghlabids (b. 756)
 Jeong, king of Balhae (Korea) (approximate date)
 Li Ning, prince of the Tang Dynasty (b. 793)
 Nikephoros, son of Constantine V (approximate date) 
 Tian Ji'an, general of the Tang Dynasty
 William of Gellone, Frankish nobleman (or 814)

References